Howearion hilli, also known as the Lord Howe semislug, is a species of semislug that is endemic to Australia's Lord Howe Island in the Tasman Sea.

Description
The shell of the mature animal is 6.9–9.1 mm in height, with a diameter of 13.4–17 mm, ear-shaped with rounded, rapidly expanding whorls, and with flattened spire and apex. It is glossy and golden in colouration. The umbilicus is closed. The aperture is ovately lunate. The animal is yellowish-cream with brown stripes and spots and tiny white flecks.

Distribution
The semislug is widespread in the lowlands of the island, as well as on the lower slopes of the southern mountains.

References

 
 

 
hilli
Gastropods of Lord Howe Island
Taxa named by James Charles Cox
Gastropods described in 1873